Tembleque is a coconut dessert pudding from Puerto Rico. It is one of the most popular desserts in Puerto Rican cuisine.

Ingredients 
 is made by cooking coconut cream, coconut milk, heavy cream (optional), salt, cornstarch, sugar, frequently orange blossom water, and garnished with ground cinnamon.

Tembleque can also be topped with a relish or syrup usually made with sugar, liqueur, spices, fruit juice or diced, and wine or  simply chocolate shavings on top.

Cultural importance 
It is a holiday dish, served on New Year's Day throughout the island of Puerto Rico. While the recipe may have originated in Puerto Rico, there are variants on the dish in Latin America and other countries. In Brazil, the dish is known as manjar branco. According to the Encyclopedia of Puerto Rico, published by the Foundation for the Humanities, each time a Puerto Rican migrant to the  United States comes closer and closer to forgetting their roots, foods like  bring them back and remind them of who they are, of their island, and of their grandmother.

Tembleque 
In Spanish, the word tembleque is an adjective used to describe something that shakes, or a noun to describe the shakes themselves. The dessert, due to its Jell-O-like gel texture, trembles, shivers, and shakes if it has been prepared correctly.

In popular culture 
 Tembleque, a reggaeton song by Jon Erik, describes the movement of  the dessert, and  the dance move

See also 

 Coconut bar
 Khanom thuai
 Bebinca
 Haupia

References 

Puerto Rican cuisine
Puddings
Foods containing coconut